The MacDonald River is a river in Quebec, Canada, to the north of the lower Saint Lawrence River. It is known for its dramatic cascade, the Chute MacDonald.

Location

The MacDonald River is in the unorganized territory of Lac-Walker in the Sept-Rivières Regional County Municipality of the Côte-Nord administrative region of Quebec.
The MacDonald is one of the main tributaries of the Aux Rochers River, the others being the Pasteur, Gravel and Schmon.

The river forms to the north of Lake Valilée from streams draining Lake des Deux Crétes, Lake Chemin de Fer and smaller water bodies.
The lower portion of the river flows through the proposed Lake Walker National Park from the point where it converges with the Ronald River.

The Cartier Railway runs along the MacDonald River valley for much of its length.
The railway links the Mont Wright iron mine near Fermont to Port-Cartier.
The railway engineers ran the line along the well-drained rocky shoreline of the river, staying safely above the level of spring floods.
The engineers kept the northbound grade to a maximum of 1.35% and the southbound grade to a maximum of 0.4%.
The rail bed is generally notched into the sides of the river valleys to avoid problems with frost heaves in the valley floor.
There is an old site near the river contaminated with light hydrocarbons (petroleum products).
The file on this site was closed in 2000.

Environment

The region is in the boreal climate zone.
A map of the Ecological regions of Quebec shows the river rising and flowing south through the eastern spruce/moss domain of the boreal zone.

Name

The Commission de toponymie du Québec, the public body responsible for managing Québec place names, says that the MacDonald River and its tributary, the Ronald River, may have been named in honor of Ian and Ronald MacDonald.
The MacDonald River was officially named on 8 April 1975.
Ian MacDonald was superintendent of the Ontario Paper Company at Shelter Bay until 1935, and Ronald was his son.

Geology

The floor of the MacDonald River valley is filled with terraced deltaic deposits formed by sedimentation in front of a decaying glacier.
One section of the lower river valley has many ridges and old meander arms, with crescent shaped sandbars covered with alders.
The MacDonald River cascade is associated with a glacial lock, or riegel, an area where the rock was more resistant to the movement of the glaciers.
Traces of the glaciers are visible near the waterfall and further upstream, including polished surfaces, striations and grooves.

Tourist attraction

The Chute MacDonald can be reached from Baie-Comeau by taking 138 east to Port-Cartier, then turning north on Shelter Bay road.
About  along this dirt road there is a parking spot near a series of rapids along the road.
From there the falls are reached by a well marked and low difficult footpath.
At the falls there are picnic tables, dry toilets and a bridge.

The MacDonald and the Aux Rochers are recognized as Atlantic salmon (Salmo salar) rivers.
During the 2006 season fly fishing was allowed from May to September for species other than salmon in the section from Lake Valilée down to MacDonald falls, and in the section below the footbridge down to the river mouth.
Fly fishing for 1-2 salmon was allowed from July to September in the section from the footbridge down to Lake Quatre Lieues.

The river is popular for canoeing, since during high water periods there are few portages.
When combined with the Aux Rochers River it gives a  descent.
The Port-Cartier-Sept-Îles Wildlife Sanctuary has developed trails along the river that lead from cottages to the Chute MacDonald.
A walkway and gazebo allow accessibility and observation of the natural environment and the geomorphology of the area.
MacDonald Falls and footbridge on the MacDonald River is one of the attractions of the Port-Cartier–Sept-Îles Wildlife Reserve, as are the Carlos Falls and the De la Montagne and MacDonald hiking trails.

The falls are among the major natural attractions that would be included in the proposed Lake Walker National Park, the others being Lake Walker, Lake Quatre Lieux, the Forêt ancienne du Lac-Larry and the Aux Rochers River.
The study of the park area by the Forest, Wildlife and Parks department was filed in 2018, but as of May 2009 the park proposal was waiting for funding.

Lakes

The official map of the proposed  Lake Walker National Park shows a number of lakes that drain into the MacDonald River, mostly from the east:

Lake Jumbo

Lac Jumbo was officially named on 3 October 1972.
The lake is 427 meters above sea level.
It is just south of Lake Larry, in the southeast of the proposed Lake Walker National Park.
It is between the Ronald River and the MacDonald River, into which it drains.
The region has high hills with flattened tops, and is crossed by numerous streams.
The eastern shore of the lake borders the Forêt ancienne du Lac-Larry (Lake Larry Old Growth Forest).
This consists mostly of black spruce and balsam fir trees that are over 200 years old and have not been seriously affected by fire, insects, windstorms or logging.

Lake Quatre Lieues

Lake Quatre Lieues is in the extreme south of the proposed Lake Walker National Park.
The MacDonald River flows through the northern end of the lake from west to east.
The Port-Cartier–Sept-Îles Wildlife Reserve offers chalet rentals for hunting and fishing in the Quatre-lieues area.

Notes

Citations

Sources

Rivers of Côte-Nord
Sept-Rivières Regional County Municipality